Eberechi Oluchi Eze (born 29 June 1998; pronounced  ) is an English professional footballer who plays as an attacking midfielder for Premier League club Crystal Palace.

Early life
Eze was born in Greenwich, Greater London to Nigerian parents. Growing up, he reflected on his life, saying: "There are the nice parts [of Greenwich] and the not so nice parts. I grew up in a not so nice part. It wasn’t the easiest life and you don’t have as much as other kids around you. The first place we’d go after school is to the cage. We’d stay there till our parents called us in, not eating, playing all day and night. There wasn’t really anything else to do. But that’s where the love comes from. [At the time], you don’t realise it’s actually how you’re learning your trade." Growing up, his footballing idol was Ronaldinho. Eze then met Bright Osayi-Samuel, his teammate during his time at Queens Park Rangers, at secondary school and played football together at the same district team.

Eze started his football career at Arsenal before being released when he was thirteen and then went on to join Fulham and Reading. Eze then appeared as a youth player at Millwall, where he signed a two–year scholarship with the club. Eze quickly progressed both the U18 side and the reserve side. It was announced in April 2016 that Eze would be leaving Millwall at the end of the 2015–16 season after not being offered a professional contract.

Club career

Queens Park Rangers
Following his release, he continued studying in college before trialling successfully with Championship club Queens Park Rangers (QPR), impressing the club's technical director Chris Ramsey. Eze completed his signing for Queens Park Rangers on 3 August 2016. On 7 January 2017, Eze made his first-team debut in an FA Cup tie against Blackburn Rovers, featuring for 18 minutes before being injured and replaced by Yeni Ngbakoto. The game resulted in a 2–1 home defeat for QPR. He then signed a contract extension with the club, keeping him until 2019. This was his only appearance of the 2016–17 season for the side.

On 30 August 2017, Eze joined League Two club Wycombe Wanderers on loan until January 2018. He made his Wycombe Wanderers debut, coming on as a 79th minute substitute, in a 0–0 draw against Newport County on 9 September 2017. Since making his debut for the club, Eze quickly became a first team regular for the side, where he rotated in different midfield positions. Eze scored his first ever senior goal on 7 October 2017, netting a brace for Wycombe against Cambridge United. His goal against Cambridge United earned him a nomination for Sky Bet League 2 Goal of the Month for October. He made a total of 20 appearances and played a part in Wycombe gaining promotion that season. Eze scored a further four times in total for Wycombe, putting in some eye-catching performances before returning to QPR in January.

After returning to QPR, Eze featured regularly for Ian Holloway's side, who planned on using him in the first team. His first appearance of the 2017–18 season came on 6 January 2018 against Milton Keynes Dons in the third round of the FA Cup, coming on as a 61st-minute substitute, in a 1–0 loss. At the end of the 2017–18 season, he went on to make 16 appearances, with his first goal for the club came on 10 March 2018 against Sunderland, the only goal of the match. Eze's second goal for QPR came in a 4–1 home win against Norwich City.

Ahead of the 2018–19 season, Holloway left Queens Park Rangers as the previous season was concluded and his replacement, Steve McClaren handed Eze the number 10 shirt for the club. A week later, he signed a new three-year contract with QPR, binding him to the club until June 2021. Eze started the season well when he scored his first goal of the season, in a 2–1 loss against Sheffield United on 11 August 2018. Eze then scored two consecutive goals between 15 September 2018 and 19 September 2018 against Bolton Wanderers and his former club, Millwall. Since the start of the 2018–19 season, he continued to be a first team regular for the side, continuing to play in different midfield positions. His performance was praised by McClaren, who said: "Eze has great talent but he did great work off the ball in terms of helping the team defend. We're asking him to do that and it's important that he does that in terms of his development." Eze then set up two goals in two matches between 20 October 2018 and 23 October 2018 against Ipswich Town and Sheffield Wednesday. A month later on 24 November 2018 against Stoke City, he set up two goals for Àngel Rangel, in a 2–2 draw. Eze’s fourth goal then came on 1 January 2019, in a 2–2 draw against Aston Villa. However towards the end of the 2018–19 season, Eze soon found himself placed at the substitute bench. He played 46 games in the 2018–19 season, scoring four times in all competitions.

In the opening game of the 2019–20 season, Eze scored his first goal of the season, "sauntered through a static Stoke City defence to double Queen Park Rangers' lead after the interval", to win 2–1. Three weeks later on 24 August 2019, he scored his second goal of the season, as well as setting up the club’s third goal of the game, in a 3–1 win against Wigan Athletic. Two weeks later on 11 September 2019, Eze scored his third goal of the season, as well as setting up Queen Park Rangers' third goal of the game, in a 3–2 win against Luton Town. After the match, he was named Team of the Week by the EFL and WhoScored.com. Since the start of the 2019–20 season, Eze retained his first team place for the side and played in different midfield positions under the new management of Mark Warburton. He then scored four more goals by the end of 2019, including two braces against Hull City and Preston North End. After the match Warburton praised his performance, saying: "Ebe is a tremendous talent. I want him to enjoy his football and he has got to understand how much hard work is required to maximise the talent that he has. He is a talented boy, is playing exceptionally well for us, scoring goals and I hope very much that he is playing with a smile on his face as well."

Eze scored his tenth goal of the season and set up two goals in a 6–1 win against Cardiff City on 1 January 2020. He continued as a first-team regular, and by the time the season was suspended because of the COVID-19 pandemic, he had made 37 league appearances and scored twelve times. Eze remained an integral part of the team once the season resumed behind closed doors. Eze then scored two more goals in the last remaining two matches of the 2019–20 season, coming against Millwall and West Bromwich Albion. He scored 14 goals in 48 games across all competitions in the 2019–2020 season, which saw him become one of England's most promising young attacking players. Following this, Eze won the club’s Sportito Supporters' Player of the Year. He was also nominated for Championship PFA Bristol Street Motors Fans’ Player of the Year for 2019–20 but lost out to Luke Ayling. On 8 September 2020, Eze was named in Professional Footballers' Association's 2019–20 EFL Championship Team of the Season. Sporting Director Les Ferdinand was quoted saying he believes if Eze continues this form, he must be selected by three lions manager Gareth Southgate for the 2021 European Championships.

Crystal Palace
On 28 August 2020, Eze signed for Premier League side Crystal Palace on a five-year deal; the fee was reportedly around £17 million. QPR had rejected a £12 million bid from Palace earlier in the month. He was given a number 25 shirt ahead of the new season. On 12 September, he made his Palace debut, coming on as an 81st minute substitute, in a 1–0 win against Southampton in the opening game of the season. Eze scored his first goal for Palace on 7 November, with a direct free kick in a 4–1 home league win over Leeds United. Eze was reported, in May 2021, to have injured his achilles in a training session and was expected to be sidelined for several months. Following the departure of Andros Townsend for Everton at the start of the 2021-22 Premier League season, Eze was given the number 10 shirt for Palace.

International career
Because Eze is of Nigerian ancestry, he has trained with the Nigeria national team. On 5 October 2018, he was called up to the England national under-20 team, and made his debut on 11 October 2018 in a 2–1 win against Italy in the Under 20 Elite League. Eze then captained England U20 for the first time, playing for 75 minutes before being substituted, in a 2–1 loss against Chile at the 2019 Toulon Tournament on 7 June 2019. He went on to make seven appearances for the U20 side.

In 2019, Nigeria Football Federation president Amaju Pinnick met with Eze in an attempt to persuade him to switch his allegiance to Nigeria. Eze said that he was undecided on who to represent, but Pinnick stated: "It appears to me that he would want to play for Nigeria, but again, there is a lot of pressure on these players who play in England". Nigeria manager Gernot Rohr later stated in January 2021 that he contacts Eze on a weekly basis.

On 3 September 2019 Eze was called up to the England U21 squad by manager Aidy Boothroyd for the upcoming UEFA European Under-21 Championship qualifiers against Turkey and Kosovo. He was an unused substitute on both occasions. Eze eventually made his U21 debut on 15 November 2019 as an 81st minute substitute for Phil Foden during a 3–0 2021 UEFA European Under-21 Championship qualification victory over Albania.

In April and November 2020, Eze said he had yet to decide on whether to play for Nigeria or his birth country, England, at senior international level.

Eze was selected for the group stage of the 2021 UEFA European Under-21 Championship and scored his only goal at under-21 level in their final game against Croatia.

In May 2021, Eze was called up to the senior England squad for the first time, as part of Gareth Southgate's 33-man provisional squad for Euro 2020, but on the same day was injured during a training session.

Career statistics

Honours
Individual
PFA Team of the Year: 2019–20 Championship

References

External links
Profile at the Crystal Palace F.C. website

1998 births
Living people
Footballers from Greenwich
English footballers
England youth international footballers
Association football forwards
Arsenal F.C. players
Fulham F.C. players
Reading F.C. players
Millwall F.C. players
Queens Park Rangers F.C. players
Wycombe Wanderers F.C. players
Crystal Palace F.C. players
English Football League players
Black British sportspeople
English people of Nigerian descent
Premier League players